Basl Kuh (also Romanized as Başl Kūh) is a village in Chehel Shahid Rural District, in the Central District of Ramsar County, Mazandaran Province, Iran. At the 2006 census, its population was 650, in 186 families.

References 

Populated places in Ramsar County